Chlístov is a municipality and village in Benešov District in the Central Bohemian Region of the Czech Republic. It has about 400 inhabitants.

Administrative parts
Villages of Racek and Žabovřesky are administrative parts of Chlístov.

References

Villages in Benešov District